Vulcan Nunatak is a nunatak, badly sculptured away by ice, the remnant of a huge cone of an extinct volcano, located 2 nautical miles (3.7 km) southeast of Mount Richardson in the Fosdick Mountains of the Ford Ranges in Marie Byrd Land. Discovered on November 28, 1934, by Paul Siple and Stevenson Corey of the Byrd Antarctic Expedition, 1933–35, who investigated the feature and referred to it as "The Volcano". A form of the original field name has been approved by Advisory Committee on Antarctic Names (US-ACAN).

Nunataks of Marie Byrd Land